Valakėliai is a village in Panevėžys County, in northeastern Lithuania. According to the 2021 census, the village had a population of 254 inhabitants.

History
In 1964, the Valakėliai Elementary School was opened.

On 13 January 2023, an explosion occurred at the Lithuania–Latvia Interconnection pipeline system by the nearby Pasvalio Vienkiemiai village. As a precaution, the entire village of Valakėliai was evacuated.

Demography

Transport
KK150 national road goes through the village with connections to Šiauliai, Pakruojis and Pasvalys.

References

Villages in Panevėžys County
Pasvalys District Municipality